Dover is an active commuter railroad train station in the borough of Dover, Morris County, New Jersey. Located at the end of electric service, Dover station serves as a secondary terminal of NJ Transit's Morristown and Montclair-Boonton Lines. Non-electric service continues west to Hackettstown on both lines. The next station to the west is Mount Arlington while the next station to the east is Denville. Dover station consists of a single island platform, accessible for the handicapped. 

The first train in Dover arrived on July 31, 1848, with the extension of the Morris and Essex Railroad from Rockaway, which opened just 27 days prior. The Delaware, Lackawanna and Western Railroad constructed the current station depot on Dickerson Street in 1901, opening on November 1. The station depot joined the National Register of Historic Places in 1980.

History
On July 31, 1848, the first train rolled into Dover over the Morris & Essex Railroad. In 1863, the Delaware, Lackawanna & Western Railroad (DL&W) acquired the Morris & Essex line.  On November 1, 1901, this new Lackawanna Station was opened in Dover with the arrival of the Buffalo Express at 3:00 p.m.  It was met by a citizens' committee and the Dover Cornet Band. After the dedication ceremonies, a dinner was served at the Mansion House Hotel.

Station layout and services
Both the Morristown Line and the Montclair-Boonton Line serve this station, with service to Hoboken or to New York City via Midtown Direct. On Saturdays, Sundays, and holidays, no trains travel further west than Dover.

There is a single center high center platform and a ticket agent in the building 7 days a week. A NJ Transit rail yard is located east of the station.

Most outbound Morristown Line and some Montclair-Boonton Line trains currently terminate at this station, as Dover is the end of electrification. Diesel service continues west to the terminus at Hackettstown.

See also
Operating Passenger Railroad Stations Thematic Resource (New Jersey)
National Register of Historic Places listings in Morris County, New Jersey
List of NJ Transit stations

Bibliography

References

External links 

 Station from Morris Street from Google Maps Street View
 Dover Area Historical Society

Dover, New Jersey
NJ Transit Rail Operations stations
Railway stations in the United States opened in 1848
Railway stations on the National Register of Historic Places in New Jersey
Former Delaware, Lackawanna and Western Railroad stations
Railway stations in Morris County, New Jersey
National Register of Historic Places in Morris County, New Jersey
New Jersey Register of Historic Places
1848 establishments in New Jersey